Silvia Patricia Núñez Ramos is an Ecuadorian politician in the Citizen Revolution Movement.

Life
In 2004 she studied civil engineering at the Technical University of Ambato.
Chimborazo Polytechnic.

In 2020 she taught at the Universidad Nacional de Chimborazo.

She was elected to represent Chumborazo at the National Assembly in 2021. The sitting President of the assembly, Guadalupe Llori, was voted out at the end of May. Núñez said she voted against Guadalupe Llori because that was the recommendation.

References

Living people
Members of the National Assembly (Ecuador)
Women members of the National Assembly (Ecuador)
Year of birth missing (living people)